Giacomo Antonio Perti (6 June 1661 – 10 April 1756) was an Italian composer of the Baroque era.  He was mainly active at Bologna, where he was Maestro di Cappella for sixty years.  He was the teacher of Giuseppe Torelli and Giovanni Battista Martini.

Life
He was born in Bologna, then part of the Papal States, and began studying music early, learning harpsichord and violin there; later he studied counterpoint.  By the age of 17 he had already written a mass, a motet, and a setting of the Magnificat; and in 1678 he wrote his first opera and oratorio.  During a stay in Parma, where he studied with Giuseppe Corsi da Celano, he formed his sacred music style; most of his psalm settings of the 1680s and 1690s show the influence of Corsi.  Later he went to Venice, most likely for a production of one of his operas.

In 1690 he was appointed to the post of Maestro di Cappella at S Pietro, replacing his uncle Lorenzo Perti.  In 1696 he became Maestro di Cappella in another Bolognese church, S. Petronio, after the death of Giovanni Paolo Colonna the year before. He remained in charge for exactly sixty years, until his death at age 95.

Perti was a prolific composer of operas and sacred music, and was recognized as a distinguished musician not only by other composers, but by aristocrats and emperors, including Ferdinando de' Medici (one of the last of the Medici) and Emperors Leopold I and Charles VI.

Works
Perti was highly regarded for his sacred music and his operas. Of the 26 operas he composed, few remain today.  Perti maintained in his Op. 1 that he was influenced by the melodic style of Francesco Cavalli, Antonio Cesti, and Luigi Rossi; however he shows considerable originality in instrumentation, use of dialogue and countermelody.  His output of sacred music was even more remarkable: he wrote 120 psalm settings, for one voice, chorus, basso continuo, and various other instruments; 54 motets, for similar forces; 28 masses; 83 versetti and other liturgical works.

He also wrote secular music, including 142 solo cantatas (one of the commonest secular vocal forms in late 17th century Italy), and some instrumental music including sonatas and sinfonias for a variety of instruments.

Operas
Marzio Coriolano, 1683
Oreste in Argo, 1685
L'incoronazione di Dario, 1686
La Flavia, 1686
La Rosaura, 1689Dionisio Siracusano, 1689Brenno in Efeso, 1690L'inganno scoperto per vendetta, 1691 Il Pompeo, 1691Furio Camillo, 1692Nerone fatto cesare, 1693 La forza della virtù, 1694Laodicea e Berenice, 1695Penelope la casta, 1696Fausta restituita all'impero, 1697Apollo geloso, 1698Lucio Vero, 1700Astianatte, 1701Dionisio re di Portogallo, 1707Il Venceslao, ossia Il fraticida innocente, 1708Ginevra principessa di Scozia, 1708Berenice regina d'Egitto, 1709Demetrio, 1709Rodelinda regina de' Longobardi, 1710
Un prologo per il cortegiano, 1739

Oratorios
Due gigli porporati nel martirio di santa Serafia e santa Sabina, Bologna, 1679
Abramo vincitor de' propri affetti, Bologna, 1683 (rev. Agar, 1689; spurious titles: Agar scacciata, Sara)
Il Mosè conduttor del popolo ebreo, Modena, 1685
Oratorio della Passione, Bologna, 1685 (rev. Gesù al sepolcro, 1703)
La beata Imelda Lambertini bolognese, (:it:beata Imelda Lambertini child saint), Bologna, 1686
«Oratorio à 6 Voci, con concertino, e concerto grosso» (unknown subject), Modena (?), 1687 (lost)
San Galgano Guidotti, Bologna, 1694
La Passione di Cristo, Bologna, 1694 (= Oratorio sopra la passione del Redentore = Affetti di compassione alla morte del Redentor della Vita; composed in collaboration with pupils)
Christo al Limbo, Bologna, 1698
La morte del giusto, overo Il transito di san Giuseppe, Venice, 1700 (lost)
La Morte delusa, Milan, 1703 (collaboration to the pasticcio)
I trionfi di Giosuè, Florence, 1704 (collaboration to the pasticcio; lost)
La sepoltura di Cristo, Bologna, 1704
San Petronio, Bologna, 1720 (pasticcio)
La Passione del Redentore, Bologna, 1721
I conforti di Maria Vergine addolorata per la morte del suo divin Figliuolo, Bologna, 1723 (spurious title: L'Amor Divino)
Il figlio prodigo, undated
Oratorio della nascita del Signore, undated
San Francesco, undated
La sepoltura di Cristo, undated (attributed to Perti; spurious title: San Giovanni)

Selected recordings
 Messa a 5, Silvia Vajente, Pamela Lucciarini, Gloria Banditelli, Orchestra Barocca di Bologna, Paolo Faldi
 Messa a 8, New College Choir, Cappella Musicale, Sergio Vartolo
 Messa a 12. Color Temporis Vocal Ensemble, Collegium usicum Almae Matris Chamber Choir, Choir & Orchestra of the Cappella Musicale Di San Petronio.
 Lamentations. Capella Musicale di S. Petronio di Bologna, dir. Sergio Vartolo
 Musiche sacre Arìon Choir & Consort, dir Giulio Prandi. Disc with Amadeus magazine, Italy 2010
 Cantate morali e spirituali op.1, 2 CDs. Frisani, Calvi, Lepore, Cappella musicale San Petronio, Sergio Vartolo
 Abramo Vincitor De' Proprii Affetti, Laura Antonaz, Elena Biscuola, Gastone Sarti, Ensemble "Il Continuo" Bongiovanni (record label)
 Gesu al Sepolcro. Akerlund, Zanetti, Claudio Cavina, Schultze, Cechetti, Cappella Musicale di S. Petronio, Vartolo
 San Petronio (Oratorio), Pace, Nirouet, Zennaro, Spagnoli, Ensemble Seicentonovecento, Flavio Colusso. Bongiovanni 1990
 Il Mosè conduttor del popolo ebreo. Mosè: Gloria Banditelli; Faraone: Marco Bussi, Generale di Faraone: Laura Antonaz.  Ensemble Les Nations. Maria Luisa Baldassari. Tactus (record label) TC 661603 (1 CD, January 2013).

References

Further reading
Jean Berger, The Sacred Works of Giacomo Antonio Perti, «Journal of the American Musicological Society», XVII, 1964, pp. 370–377.
Marcello De Angelis, Il teatro di Pratolino tra Scarlatti e Perti. Il carteggio di Giacomo Antonio Perti con il principe Ferdinando de' Medici (1705-1710), «Nuova Rivista musicale italiana», XXI, 1987, pp. 606–640.
Mario Fabbri, Nuova luce sull’attività fiorentina di Giacomo Antonio Perti, Bartolomeo Cristofori e Giorgio F. Haendel: valore storico e critico di una “Memoria” di Francesco M. Mannucci, «Chigiana», XXI, 1964, pp. 143–190.
Osvaldo Gambassi, L’Accademia Filarmonica di Bologna. Fondazione, statuti e aggregazioni, Florence, Olschki, 1992 («Historiae musicae cultores», LXIII). 
 Francesco Lora, I drammi per musica di Giacomo Antonio Perti per il teatro della Villa medicea di Pratolino (1700-01; 1707-10), Ph.D. diss., Università di Bologna, 2012.
 Francesco Lora, Introduction to Giacomo Antonio Perti, Integrale della musica sacra per Ferdinando de’ Medici, principe di Toscana (Firenze 1704-1709), ed. by Francesco Lora, Bologna, Ut Orpheus, 2010-2011, 2 voll. («Tesori musicali emiliani», 2-3), vol. I, pp. V-XVIII, and vol. II, pp. V-XVIII. 
Francesco Lora, I mottetti di Giacomo Antonio Perti per Ferdinando de' Medici principe di Toscana. Ricognizione, cronologia e critica delle fonti, tesi di laurea, Università di Bologna, a.a. 2005/06.
Francesco Lora, Mottetti grossi di Perti per le chiese di Bologna: una struttura con replica conclusiva del primo coro, senza «Alleluia», «Rassegna storica crevalcorese», n. 4, December 2006, pp. 26–57.
Francesco Lora, Nel teatro del Principe. I drammi per musica di Giacomo Antonio Perti per la Villa medicea di Pratolino, Torino-Bologna, De Sono - Albisani, 2016.
Ausilia Magaudda - Danilo Costantini, Aurora Sanseverino (1669-1726) e la sua attività di committente musicale nel Regno di Napoli. Con notizie inedite sulla napoletana congregazione dei Sette Dolori, in Giacomo Francesco Milano e il ruolo dell'aristocrazia nel patrocinio delle attività musicali nel secolo XVIII. Atti del Convegno Internazionale di Studi (Polistena - San Giorgio Morgeto, 12-14 ottobre 1999), edited by Gaetano Pitarresi, Reggio Calabria, Laruffa, 2001, pp. 297–415.
Juliane Riepe, Gli oratorii di Giacomo Antonio Perti: cronologia e ricognizione delle fonti, «Studi musicali», XXII, 1993, pp. 115–232.
Anne Schnoebelen, Performance Practices at San Petronio in the Baroque, «Acta Musicologica», XLI, 1969, pp. 37–53.
Giuseppe Vecchi, Giacomo Antonio Perti (1661-1756), Bologna, Accademia Filarmonica, 1961.
Carlo Vitali, Preghiera, arte e business nei mottetti di Perti, «MI», a. XII, n. 4, ottobre-novembre 2002, pp. 29–30.
 Rodolfo Zitellini, Introduction to Giacomo Antonio Perti, Five-voice Motets for the Assumption of the Virgin Mary, ed. by Rodolfo Zitellini, Madison, A-R Editions, 2007 («Recent Researches in the Music of the Baroque Era», 147), pp. IX-XIV.

External links

 "L'Inganno scoperto per Vendetta" (1691), Modern performing edition of opening sinfonia edited by Mark Latham and published by Breitkopf & Härtel, Wiesbaden, 1999, ISMN: M-004-48847-8

Italian Baroque composers
1661 births
1756 deaths
Musicians from Bologna
Italian male classical composers
17th-century Italian composers
18th-century Italian composers
18th-century Italian male musicians
17th-century male musicians